Ballet Austin is the 12th largest classical ballet company in the US, and also operates the largest combined training facility associated with a professional ballet company in the United States. Each year the Ballet Austin company performs ballets from a wide variety of choreographers, including Stephen Mills.

Performances
Ballet Austin has performed in a State Department trip to Europe as well as at the Joyce Theater in New York City and The Kennedy Center in Washington, D.C.

Education
The Ballet Austin Academy serves more than 900 students each year as one of the largest classical ballet schools in the country. It offers classes from creative movement, ages three and four, all the way to pre-professional. The academy students are given the opportunity to perform in the company production The Nutcracker, performed by Ballet Austin during the month of December for more than 53 years. Ballet Austin's Nutcracker is the longest running in the state of Texas.

Ballet Austin's apprentice company, Ballet Austin II, offers an opportunity for post-high school, advanced dancers to hone their skills. Established in 1999 by associate artistic director Michelle Martin, Ballet Austin II is made up of 10 emerging artists.

Founded in 2007, the Butler Center for Dance & Fitness serves over 8,000 people with year-round classes in ballet to modern, hip hop to hula, and jazz to Broadway. The company has developed outreach initiatives that reach 31 Central Texas school districts and 200 other area non-profits.

Ballet Austin offers fitness and dance programs for the public, such as yoga, Pilates, adult ballet, hula, hip-hop, jazz, tap, modern and musical theater.

Facilities
Ballet Austin is located in a 34,000 sq/ft facility named the Butler Dance Education Center in downtown Austin at 3rd Street and San Antonio Street. The center features administrative offices, box office, eight rehearsal studios, a 1,500 sq. ft fully equipped Pilates studio and the AustinVentures StudioTheater with 287 seats.

Reception
Dance Magazine called the ensemble "sleek and sophisticated", while The Washington Post dubbed it "one of the nation's best kept ballet secrets". Mills' work with Ballet Austin has been declared" whimsical and fantastic" (Dallas Morning News), "effortlessly striking" (Dance View Times), and "meaningful" (Pointe magazine).

Artists

Artistic Director
Named Artistic Director in 2000, Stephen Mills is an American dancer and choreographer.

Company dancers
There are twenty two full-time professional dancers, recruited from an annual 30-city audition tour.
As of November 2015:

 Ian J. Bethany
 Orlando Julius Canova
 Edward Carr
 Oliver Greene-Cramer
 James Fuller
 Ashley Lynn Sherman
 Rebecca Johnson
 Aara Krumpe
 Grace Morton
 Kevin Murdock-Waters
 Preston Andrew Patterson
 Elise Pekarek
 Chelsea Renner
 Brittany Strickland
 Christopher Swaim
 Cassia Wilson
 Jaime Lynn Witts

Ballet Austin II dancers
As of September 2016:

 Abby Chen
 Nicole Del Bene
 Constance Doyle
 Katherine Deuitch
 Paul Martin
 Hailey Dupont
 Matthew Gattozzi
 Jake Howard
 Madeline Mass

See also

 Stanley Hall (dancer)

References

External links

Ballet companies in the United States
Ballet schools in the United States
Ballet Austin
Dance schools in the United States
Dance in Texas